Lubomira Stoynova is a Bulgarian badminton player.

Achievements

BWF International Challenge/Series 
Mixed doubles

  BWF International Challenge tournament
  BWF International Series tournament
  BWF Future Series tournament

References

External links 
 

Year of birth missing (living people)
Living people
Bulgarian female badminton players